The railway from Thessaloniki to Bitola is a  long railway line, that connects the port city Thessaloniki in Greece with Bitola in the Republic of North Macedonia, via Veroia, Edessa, Amyntaio and Florina. The line was opened in 1894 under the name "Société du Chemin de Fer ottoman Salonique-Monastir", when the area was part of the Ottoman Empire. The section between the international border and Bitola is not used anymore, and  passenger services are restricted to the section between Thessaloniki and Florina. The easternmost section of the line, Platy–Thessaloniki, is part of the important connection towards Athens and Northern Greece.

Course
The eastern terminus of the Thessaloniki–Bitola railway is the New Railway Station, Thessaloniki. Leaving the Athens–Thessaloniki mainline at Platy, it runs alongside the Aliakmon River, through Alexandreia and then passes through to Veroia, Naousa, and Skydra, before climbing to Edessa and then, along the northern shore of Lake Vegoritida, reaching Amyntaio. At Amyntaio the Kozani–Amyntaio railway branches off towards Kozani, serving Ptolemaida and the power stations of the national power company ΔΕΗ. The main line continues towards the city of Florina. At Neos Kafkasos, the international border is crossed, and after 219 km the city of Bitola in the Republic of North Macedonia is reached. This short international connection is now disused, with all international traffic being routed via Idomeni and Gevgelija.

Main stations
The main stations on the Thessaloniki–Bitola railway are:
 New Railway Station, Thessaloniki
 Platy railway station 
 Veroia railway station 
 Edessa railway station
 Amyntaio railway station
 Florina railway station 
 Bitola railway station

History
The idea of a trans-Macedonian railway had existed since the 1850s when, in January 1859, a Memorandum regarding the construction of the Salonica–Monastir (today's Bitola) line was signed. It, however, wasn't until 28 October 1890 that the Ottoman Sublime Porte gave Deutsche Bank a concession to build the railway as a branch line of the Oriental Railways and to possibly further extend it to an Albanian port.

"Société du Chemin de Fer ottoman Salonique-Monastir" was set up as an Ottoman company, and its headquarters were in Constantinople. The construction works started in May 1891 and were completed in June 1894. Upon completion, the line operations were given to the Chemins de fer Orientaux, which were already operating the Salonique to Mitrovica and Vranje railways. Whether Baron Maurice de Hirsch took an active role in this railway is debatable, considering he retired from the Balkan railway building shortly before this project began. 
While at that time, the practice of compulsory work was still in use, labour was cheap in rural Macedonia, and the engineers were reported to be enthusiastically welcomed.

After the end of Balkan Wars in 1913, the line ended fully in Greek territory, except for the last 17 km to Monastir, which ended up in Yugoslavia. The Greek government purchased the Greek part Salonica Monastir railway on 17 October 1925, and the railway became part of the Hellenic State Railways.

Locomotives 
Locomotives of the Salonic Monastir Railway

Services
The Thessaloniki–Bitola railway is used by the following passenger services:
Intercity, Express and Regular services Athens–Thessaloniki and Thessaloniki–Kalampaka
Local services Thessaloniki–Florina and Thessaloniki–Larissa

Gallery

See also
 Chemins de fer Orientaux

References

Further reading
 

Railway lines in Greece
Railway lines in North Macedonia
Rail transport in North Macedonia
Standard gauge railways in Greece
Ottoman railways